was a Japanese politician of the Democratic Party of Japan, a member of the House of Representatives in the Diet (national legislature). A native of Sapporo, Hokkaido and graduate of Showa Pharmaceutical University, he was elected to the House of Representatives for the first time in 2000 after an unsuccessful run in 1996.

References

External links 
  

2021 deaths
1942 births
People from Sapporo
Japanese pharmacists
Japanese racehorse owners and breeders
Members of the House of Representatives (Japan)
Democratic Party of Japan politicians
Ministers of Health, Labour and Welfare of Japan
21st-century Japanese politicians